Luis Crisologo Singson (born June 21, 1941), better known as Chavit Singson, is a Filipino businessman and politician, serving as the mayor of Narvacan, Ilocos Sur, since 2019 up to 2022.  He was the governor of the province of Ilocos Sur, starting from 1972 until 1986, again from 1992 until 2001, and again from 2004 to 2007 and from 2010 until 2013. He was also the Deputy National Security Adviser for the Philippine government (2008).

He ran for Senator under Team Unity in 2007, but lost.

Early life
Chavit Singson was born on June 21, 1941, in Vigan, Ilocos Sur. He is second eldest among the seven children of José Singson and Caridad Crisólogo. He studied in Colegio de San Juan de Letran in Manila and finished his Commerce degree.

Both his paternal (Singson) and maternal (Crisologo) families have dominated the political environment of the Ilocos region for generations. Although many members of both families, such as Chavit are related to one another, the two families have shared a bitter feud which reached its apex in the 1960s and 1970s, when shootings and political intimidation were rampant in the Ilocos region. Chavit considered his uncle, Floro Crisologo as a mentor, but eventually had a severe falling out with his cousin and once-confidant Vincent Crisologo who was Floro's son and there were many bloody encounters between the two. It is currently stated by both sides that tensions have eased.

Political career
Singson had secured a spot as a candidate for the 2007 Philippine senatorial elections. He has sided with  the government party, despite being former friends with the former president Joseph Estrada. After losing the elections, Singson had been appointed Deputy National Security Adviser, on September 5, 2008, by Gloria Macapagal Arroyo. He mended his friendship with Estrada sometime later. He was a member of Lakas-CMD until 2010.

In the 2010 Philippine presidential election he endorsed the bid of Manny Villar of the Nacionalista Party and in the 2013 elections he supported the candidates of the United Nationalist Alliance.

Singson has served as governor of Ilocos Sur for multiple terms. In 2019, he was elected as mayor of Narvacan under the local party Bileg Ti Ilokano.

Singson is also a longtime supporter of boxer Manny Pacquiao who was elected as senator in 2016. However they had a falling out after Pacquiao pushed to increase the tobacco excise tax. Singson opposed Pacquiao's move saying that the tax increase would "kill" the tobacco industry, with his province Ilocos Sur being a major tobacco producer. Singson alleged that his unnamed "handlers" advised Pacquiao to project an image of someone who "isn't easily controlled by anyone" – by Pacquiao disassociating with Singson.

On June 19, 2021, Singson joined the Nationalist People’s Coalition.

Business career
Through his conglomerate LCS Group of Companies, Singson pledged to raise $11 million needed to host the Miss Universe 2016 pageant in the country on January 30, 2017, according to Tourism Secretary Wanda Teo. For the big event, which was to entail a budget of about $13-million, Singson had tapped possible sponsors including big hotels where the candidates and the Miss Universe entourage will be billeted. On October 8, the company filed its bid to become a third telecommunications provider in the Philippines.

In November 2018, Singson entered the Philippine automobile industry with Legado Motors Inc. (LMI), which is the exclusive distributor of GAC Motor vehicles.

Involvement in sports
Presently, Singson is the president of the Philippine National Shooting Association, a local governing body for shooting sports in the country since 2018. Singson was also noted for his affiliation with professional boxer, Manny Pacquiao often accompanying him in trainings, press releases, and his fights. He was also involved in negotiations in securing a bout for Pacquiao with Floyd Mayweather Jr.

Personal life
Singson was first married to Evelyn Singson. He has a son with Evelyn, Ryan Luis Singson who grew up to be a politician like himself. The couple which later separated, had six other children.

He also had Rachel Tiongson as his common-law wife with whom he has five children. Their relationship ended by 2009 after Tiongson was beat up by Singson after she allegedly have an affair with another man although Tiongson claimed they have been estranged since November 2008.

In 2012, Singson publicly introduced Josephine Pintor as his partner.

Singson does trophy hunting as a hobby. He established in the Baluarte Zoo in Vigan after his game collection grew large. He keeps taxidermized remains of some of the animals he hunted at the Safari Gallery in Baluarte.

References

Further reading
 Limpe, Linda C.The 9 Lives of Luis "Chavit" Singson, Foresight Books, 2003.

1941 births
Living people
Governors of Ilocos Sur
Colegio de San Juan de Letran alumni
People from Vigan
Ilocano people
Liberal Party (Philippines) politicians
Kilusang Bagong Lipunan politicians
PDP–Laban politicians
Laban ng Demokratikong Pilipino politicians
Pwersa ng Masang Pilipino politicians
Lakas–CMD (1991) politicians
Lakas–CMD politicians
Nacionalista Party politicians
Nationalist People's Coalition politicians
Members of the House of Representatives of the Philippines from Ilocos Sur
Filipino Roman Catholics
Filipino sports executives and administrators